Service star may refer to:

 service star, a U.S. military award, also known as a battle star or campaign star.
 Service Star (Congo), the "Service Star", a Belgian civil award for service in the Congo
 Distinguished Service Star, Philippine military award
 The Service Star (film), a 1918 U.S. silent film
 war hero, a star of the service

See also
 Military Star, Irish military award
 General Campaign Star, Canadian military award
 Intelligence Star, U.S. CIA award for service to the CIA
 CIA Memorial Wall, memorial stars for agents who died in the duty of the service
 Star Air Service (1932-1944) U.S. airline
 Battlestar (disambiguation)
 bronze star
 Silver Star (disambiguation)
 Gold Star (disambiguation)
 Service (disambiguation)
 Star (disambiguation)